Transcendence Theatre Company is a professional regional theatre company founded in 2008 in Sonoma County, California. The company produces Broadway concerts and musicals.

History
Transcendence Theatre Company (TTC) was established in 2008 as a 501c3 non-profit performing arts organization.

In 2011 TTC produced Broadway Under the Stars, a benefit concert for the Valley of the Moon Natural History Association, a 501c3 non-profit organization which takes care of Jack London, Annadel and Sugarloaf Ridge State Parks.

Relationship with Jack London State Historic Park 
In the first two seasons, Transcendence gave over $72,000 to Jack London State Historic Park to help prevent the park from being closed. A portion of every ticket sale  goes to the park. As of the summer of 2017 Transcendence had given over $350,000 to Jack London State Park. As of the end of 2020 Transcendence had given over $530,000 to Jack London State Park.

Allegations of toxic culture 
In February 2021 TTC Director of Education and Community Engagement Nikko Kimzin publicly announced that he had resigned, stating his reasons as “…the Transcendence Executive Team’s ongoing suppression of equity, diversity, and inclusion practices and inaction toward becoming an equitable theater” and for their creation of “a hostile work environment where I could no longer be successful in serving all of our diverse communities.” The organization received further coverage of their efforts to address the situation.

Awards

Past performers 

2011

2012

2013

2014

2015

2016

2017

2019

Performance history 

2011

1. Broadway Under The Stars in Jack London State Historic State Park (one-night benefit concert) | Broadway Under the Stars

2012

1. Dream The Impossible Dream | Broadway Under the Stars

2. Fantastical Family Night | Broadway Under the Stars

3. What A Wonderful World | Broadway Under the Stars

4. Gala Celebration | Broadway Under the Stars

2013

1. Fly Me To The Moon | Broadway Under the Stars

2. Fantastical Family Night | Broadway Under the Stars

3. Dancing Through Life | Broadway Under the Stars

4. Gala Celebration | Broadway Under the Stars

5. Carrie Manolakos in Concert | Transcendence Artist Series

6. An Evening with Sutton Foster | Transcendence Artist Series

7. Leah Sprecher's "Old at Heart" | Transcendence Artist Series

8. The Stephanie Cadman Trio | Transcendence Artist Series

2014

1. One Singular Sensation | Broadway Under the Stars

2. Fantastical Family Night | Broadway Under the Stars

3. The Music Of The Night | Broadway Under the Stars

4. Gala Celebration | Broadway Under the Stars

5. Lexy Fridell in "Brace Yourself" | Transcendence Artist Series

6. Carrie Manolakos & Morgan Kerr in Concert | Transcendence Artist Series

7. Steppin' Out Live! With Ben Vereen | Transcendence Artist Series

8. "Witness Uganda" By Matt Gould & Griffith Matthews | Transcendence Artist Series

9. "Oh What a Beautiful Mashup!" With Leah Sprecher & Stephan Stubbins | Transcendence Artist Series

2015

1. Oh What a Night! | Broadway Under the Stars

2. Fantastical Family Night | Broadway Under the Stars

3. Rhythm of Life | Broadway Under the Stars

4. Gala Celebration | Broadway Under the Stars

5. Superheroes in Love | Transcendence Artist Series

6. Megan Hilty in Concert | Transcendence Artist Series

7. Off to the Cloud | Transcendence Artist Series

8. Imagine | Transcendence Artist Series

2016

1. This Magic Moment | Broadway Under the Stars

2. Fantastical Family Night | Broadway Under the Stars

3. Dance the Night Away | Broadway Under the Stars

4. Gala Celebration | Broadway Under the Stars

5. Wine Country Speakeasy | Transcendence Experiences

6. Joy to the World

7. The Best of Broadway

2017

1. Another Openin' Another Show | Broadway Under the Stars

2. Fantastical Family Night | Broadway Under the Stars

3. Fascinating Rhythm | Broadway Under the Stars

4. Gala Celebration | Broadway Under the Stars

5. Broadway Holiday Spectacular

2018

1. Stairway to Paradise | Broadway Under the Stars

2. Fantastical Family Night | Broadway Under the Stars

3. Shall We Dance | Broadway Under the Stars

4. Gala Celebration | Broadway Under the Stars

5. Broadway Holiday Spectacular

2019

1. A Chorus Line | Broadway Under the Stars

2. Fantastical Family Night | Broadway Under the Stars

3. Those Dancin' Feet | Broadway Under the Stars

4. The Big Gala Celebration | Broadway Under the Stars

References

External links 
Official website
Youtube page

Theatre in the San Francisco Bay Area
Organizations based in Sonoma County, California
501(c)(3) organizations
2008 establishments in California